Zaza Enden (born Zaza Eladze on 28 May 1976 in Tbilisi, Georgian Soviet Socialist Republic, Soviet Union (present Georgia) is a professional wrestler and a Turkish professional basketball player of Georgian descent. He is 2.06 m tall and weighs 116 kg. His well-known nickname is "Tatu". Zaza Enden plays at the power forward position. He came to Turkey in 1992, firstly to Trabzon, afterwards he had his Turkish citizenship.

Zaza Enden spent his best years with Fenerbahçe, playing at Euroleague level and he was the team captain between 1998-2003.

As the player-coach for Akçakoca Poyraz Gençlik in Düzce Enden helped his team win promotion to the Second Basketball League at the end of the season 2006-07.

In 2010, Enden joined the professional wrestling promotion Turkish Power Wrestling.

References

External links
TBLStat.net Profile
TurkSports.Net Profile

1976 births
Living people
Darüşşafaka Basketbol players
Fenerbahçe men's basketball players
Georgian emigrants to Turkey
Men's basketball players from Georgia (country)
Mersin Büyükşehir Belediyesi S.K. players
Naturalized citizens of Turkey
Power forwards (basketball)
Basketball players from Tbilisi
Turkish expatriate basketball people in France
Turkish men's basketball players
Turkish people of Georgian descent
Turkish professional wrestlers